Patrick Heenan may refer to:

Patrick Stanley Vaughan Heenan (1910–1942), British Indian Army officer, alleged spy and traitor
Pat Heenan (Patrick Dennis Heenan), American football cornerback

See also
Heenan (disambiguation)